Nea Anchialos National Airport  is an airport located near the town of Nea Anchialos in Greece. It serves the department of Magnesia and is also known as Central Greece Airport.

Overview
It is designed to be upgraded over the ensuing years in order to accommodate the increase in air travel and its upgrades are planned in a six-phase framework. It currently has one terminal.

The airport is developed by public partnership and began operation in February 1991. It is the only civilian airport that serves the cities of Volos, Almyros, Lamia, Larisa, Farsala, Kalampaka, Trikala, and Karditsa.

Airlines and destinations
The following airlines operate regular scheduled and charter flights at Nea Anchialos Airport:

Statistics

Ground transport
There is a bus connecting airport and Volos bus station. Buses are waiting to pick up travelers after a plane lands. The airport is also accessible by the E75 highway.

See also
Transport in Greece

References

External links
 Official website
 
 

Airports in Greece
Transport infrastructure in Thessaly
Volos